The 1958 United States Senate election in Nebraska took place on November 4, 1958. The incumbent Republican Senator, Roman Hruska, was re-elected to a full term, having previously been elected in a special election. He defeated Frank B. Morrison.

Democratic primary

Candidates
Frank B. Morrison, Democratic candidate for Nebraska's 1st district in 1954
Eugene D. O'Sullivan, former representative for Nebraska's 2nd district

Results

Republican primary

Candidates
Roman Hruska, the incumbent Senator

Results

Results

References 

1958
Nebraska
United States Senate